Mary Mooney (born 1 December 1958) is a former Irish Fianna Fáil politician. She was elected to Dáil Éireann as a Fianna Fáil Teachta Dála (TD) for the Dublin South-Central constituency at the 1987 general election. She was Vice-Chairperson of the Joint Oireachtas Committee on Women's Rights from 1987 to 1989. She lost her seat at the 1989 general election. She was elected as a local councillor in 1985 for South Inner city area of Dublin City Council. She lost her seat at the 2004 local elections.

On 23rd January 1988 she presented the Saturday Live programme on RTE 1 that night.

References

1958 births
Living people
Fianna Fáil TDs
Members of the 25th Dáil
20th-century women Teachtaí Dála
Local councillors in Dublin (city)